Addis Admass is a  private  Amharic Language newspaper published in Ethiopia.

References

External links
Addis Admass website

Newspapers published in Ethiopia
Amharic-language newspapers
Mass media in Addis Ababa